Tyne was launched in Newcastle upon Tyne in 1798. She sailed between Dublin and the United States and apparently was captured c. 1801.

Tyne first appeared in Lloyd's Register (LR) in 1799. In 1801 LR carried the annotation "captured" by her name. It continued to carry the same entry for some years thereafter.

In 1799 Lloyd's List reported that the privateer Hussar had captured Nine Sisters, Simpson, master, and carried her into Surinam on 12 June 1799. She had been on a voyage from Dublin to Jamaica. Nine Sisters, of 208 tons (bm), launched in 1785, too had belonged to Hawksley.

Citations

1798 ships
Ships built on the River Tyne
Age of Sail merchant ships of England
Captured ships